Canada competed in the 2002 Winter Paralympics in Salt Lake City, United States, from March 7 to 16, 2002. A total of 27 athletes (23 male and 4 female), were sent by the Canadian Paralympic Committee to compete in three sports. Canada won 15 medals and finished sixth on the medal table, the best finish at the Winter Paralympics at that time.

Medalists

See also
Canada at the 2002 Winter Olympics
Canada at the Paralympics

References

External links
Canadian Paralympic Committee official website
International Paralympic Committee official website

Nations at the 2002 Winter Paralympics
2002
Paralympics